Nancy Nye Masterton (November 30, 1930 – May 17, 2015) was an American farmer, volunteer and politician.

Born in Watertown, Massachusetts, Masterton moved with her husband to Cape Elizabeth, Maine. Masterton volunteered with several groups and had a farm in Denmark, Maine. From 1977 to 1985, Masterton served in the Maine House of Representatives and was a Republican. Masterton died in Cape Elizabeth, Maine.

References

1930 births
2015 deaths
People from Cape Elizabeth, Maine
People from Denmark, Maine
People from Watertown, Massachusetts
Farmers from Maine
Women state legislators in Maine
Republican Party members of the Maine House of Representatives
21st-century American women